Savage Amusement is the tenth studio album by the German hard rock band Scorpions, released in 1988. It peaked at No. 5 in the US and was certified platinum by the RIAA on June 20, 1988. It was the last Scorpions record to be produced by Dieter Dierks.

Cover art
The cover shows a woman wearing a black dress on a dark blue background. With her right hand she hides her eyes; thus, only her mouth and nose are visible. The cover of Savage Amusement is notable, however, for the fact that instead of the lady's right leg, a scorpion tail is seen. The typical band logo is shown on the upper left, while the title of the album is found in the lower right corner, in red, and underlined (also in red).

Track listing

Personnel
Scorpions
Klaus Meine – lead vocals, backing vocals
Rudolf Schenker – rhythm guitars, lead guitars, slide guitars, acoustic guitars, backing vocals 
Matthias Jabs – lead guitars, rhythm guitars, acoustic guitars, voice box, backing vocals
Francis Buchholz – bass, backing vocals
Herman Rarebell – drums, backing vocals

Additional musicians
Lee Aaron – backing vocals on "Rhythm of Love"
Peter Baltes – intro vocals on "Every Minute Every Day"

Production
Dieter Dierks – producer, engineer, mixing on tracks 2 and 9
Ian Taylor, Gerd Rautenbach – engineers
Mike Shipley – mixing on tracks 2 and 9
Nigel Green and Scorpions – mixing at Battery Studios, London
Howie Weinberg – mastering at Masterdisk, New York

Charts

Album

Singles

Certifications

References

1988 albums
Scorpions (band) albums
Harvest Records albums
Mercury Records albums
Albums produced by Dieter Dierks
Glam metal albums